Infinity Park is a stadium in the Denver enclave of Glendale, Colorado, and was formerly the unofficial home venue of the United States national rugby union team. The stadium has a seating capacity of 5,000 people. It opened in 2007, at a cost of $22.5 million. It is the first rugby-specific, municipally-owned stadium in the United States.

Infinity Park is the venue for several domestic rugby union teams. The field is home to the Glendale Merlins, a Division I men's rugby team that have won the national championship, and of the Denver Barbarians. The stadium also hosts the Women's Premier League's Glendale Lady Merlins.  The defunct Denver Stampede of the defunct PRO Rugby played at the stadium between April and May 2016 as did the Merlins' professional offshoot Colorado Raptors who played in Major League Rugby between 2018 and 2020.

Infinity Park also hosts various tournaments. The stadium regularly hosts USA Rugby national men's club semifinals and finals championships. Infinity Park is the home of the Serevi Rugbytown Sevens Tournament which takes place in August each year and attracts teams from around the world to compete for a winner-take-all $10,000 cash prize. Most notably, it became the new home of the USA Women's Sevens, the country's stop in the annual World Rugby Women's Sevens Series, starting with the 2018–19 season.

International rugby
Infinity Park has hosted international rugby test matches. It hosted the 2009 and 2010 Churchill Cup, a now-defunct international rugby tournament involving the United States, Canada, England, France, Argentina and other countries.  It has also been the venue for various international test matches, such as the August 2011 United States v. Canada match, which sold out; and the June 2012 United States v. Georgia match.

On April 26, 2019, it hosted the USA women taking on the invitational Barbarians Women, the first-ever match against international competition for the Barbarians.

In 2021, Infinity Park hosted home matches for the United States as part of the 2023 Rugby World Cup Qualifiers.

College rugby
Infinity Park has also hosted various college rugby championships and other matches. Infinity Park has hosted the men's collegiate all-stars (2008-2011). The stadium has also hosted Division I college rugby matches played by the University of Colorado and Colorado State University. The venue has also hosted the Champions Cup of the National Small College Rugby Organization (NSCRO).

References

External links

 

Rugby union stadiums in Denver
Major League Rugby stadiums
American Raptors
Sports venues in Denver
Sports venues completed in 2007
2007 establishments in Colorado
Buildings and structures in Arapahoe County, Colorado